John Henry George Devey (26 December 1866 – 11 October 1940) was an English football player and a first-class cricketer. He is considered one of Aston Villa's greatest captains.

Football career
Devey was born in Birmingham and signed for Aston Villa in March 1891; A skilful inside right/centre-forward and an England international with two caps, he was exceptionally clever with head and feet in front of goal and a prolific goalscorer. He was Villa's top goal scorer in 6 of his 12 seasons with the club.

For eight years, Devey captained Aston Villa during which time they won the League championship five times between 1894 and 1900 and the FA Cup twice. Including the famous 'Double' in the 1896–97 season. 

In October 1896 Devey was awarded a benefit match against Derby County, after which he was presented with an illuminated address from the club with the following words:  

William McGregor said this about Devey:  

He retired as a player in April 1902 and was an Aston Villa director for the next 32 years, during which time he was actively involved with training and scouting new players.

Cricket career
Jack Devey was also a Warwickshire cricketer, first appearing for the county side in 1887, though matches were only rated as first-class from 1894. He was a right-handed batsman who batted in the middle order until around 1900, but then opened the innings until his final retirement from the game in 1907. He also bowled occasional right-arm medium pace.

Professional Baseball

In 1890 Devey played professional baseball for Aston Villa in the National League of Baseball of Great Britain. He was a gifted baseball player, who led the statistical categories at the end of the year, including being the league’s batting champion.

Family
He was one of five brothers who all played professional football, Ted and Will for Small Heath and John, Harry and Bob for Aston Villa. Another brother, Abel, was a cricketer with Staffordshire.

Death
Devey stood down as a Villa director in 1934. He died 11th October 1940. The pall bearers at his funeral were six former Villa players: Billy Walker, Richard York, Arthur Dorrell, Jimmy Gibson, George Brown and Frank Barson ― all old international players.

Honours
Aston Villa
 Football League First Division: 1893–94, 1895–96, 1896–97, 1898–99, 1899–00
 FA Cup: 1895, 1897

References

External links

Profile on www.cricketarchive.com
Profile on www.englandfc.com

1866 births
1940 deaths
Cricketers from Birmingham, West Midlands
Footballers from Birmingham, West Midlands
English footballers
England international footballers
Association football forwards
Aston Unity F.C. players
West Bromwich Albion F.C. players
Birmingham St George's F.C. players
Aston Villa F.C. players
Football Alliance players
English Football League players
English Football League representative players
English cricketers
Warwickshire cricketers
Players cricketers
English cricketers of 1864 to 1889
English cricketers of 1890 to 1918
FA Cup Final players
Aston Villa F.C. directors and chairmen
English baseball players